Belstaff is a clothing brand owned by British chemicals company Ineos. The company was founded in 1924 by Eli Belovitch and his son-in-law Harry Grosberg in Longton, Stoke-on-Trent, Staffordshire. The name Belstaff is a combination of Eli's surname and his Staffordshire home. Belstaff was the first company to use wax cotton in the manufacturing of waterproof apparel for motorcycling.

History

Belstaff was founded in 1924 by Eli Belovitch and his son-in-law Harry Grosberg in Longton, Stoke-on-Trent, Staffordshire, England. In 1948, Belstaff became a subsidiary of James Halstead. The company was affected by the textile crisis of the 1990s, precipitating the closure of the Longton factory after previously closing its Silverdale site. James Halstead continued to own the brand selling the Belstaff motorcycle range and helmet brands until 2004. Alongside this, they promoted the fashion side across Europe, Australia, and the US. The brand was sold in 2004 to Franco Malenotti of Sponsor SA Italy. Kate Moss was paid £1,000,000 to appear in Belstaff ads.

In June 2011, Harry Slatkin and The Labelux Group bought Belstaff. Slatkin assumed the CEO role and appointed Martin Cooper as Chief Creative Officer, and together, they planned to reposition Belstaff as an English heritage brand centered on luxury sportswear. Tommy Hilfiger was brought in as a business consultant.

In 2012, the company opened stores in Via Della Spiga Milan, New Bond Street, London and, Madison Avenue, New York City. Bill Sofield designed the interiors.

In July 2014, along with Jimmy Choo and Bally, Belstaff was acquired by the parent group JAB Luxury. In 2015, Belstaff and Legs Media made a 17-minute commercial, Outlaws, with David Beckham, Harvey Keitel, Katherine Waterston, and Cathy Moriarty. In early 2016, Belstaff made a 3-minute commercial, Falling Up, in which Liv Tyler retraces the footsteps of 1920s aviator Amelia Earhart. 
Delphine Ninous became men's and women's Creative Director in July 2016.

In 2017, Belstaff opened a store in Ginza Six, Tokyo and was bought by UK company Ineos in late 2017. Helen Wright was appointed CEO in 2018. Sean Lehnhardt-Moore became the new creative director in 2018. Fran Millar was appointed CEO in 2020, leaving her position at the UCI World Tour cycling team, the Ineos Grenadiers (formerly Team INEOS and Team Sky).

In 2019, Belstaff exited its Madison Avenue, NYC store, and in 2020, Belstaff opened its eleventh store globally, a store in the Meatpacking District.

References

Notes

External links

Textile manufacturers of England
Motorcycle safety gear manufacturers
Motorcycling retailers
British companies established in 1924
Manufacturing companies established in 1924